Anton (Anatole) P. Solomoukha ( 2 November 1945 – 21 October 2015) was a Ukrainian-born French artist and photographer, and a foreign member of the Ukrainian Academy of Arts. From 1980, he specialized in narrative figuration. After 2000, he developed photo projects and is known as the inventor of a new form of expression in contemporary photography: “Photo painting”. In it, he associates the photographic image with pictorial research in tableaux frequently requiring a multitude of models.

Biography
Solomoukha was born in Kiev, Ukraine (then part of the USSR). His family was part of the Soviet intelligentsia. His father, Pavel Davidovich Solomoukha, was a veteran of the Second World War. In 1943, following the liberation of Ukraine, he was given the job of recruiting and organizing the training of teachers in a department under the Secretariat of Nikita Khrushchev, who later became the First Secretary of the Communist Party of the Soviet Union. His mother, Galina von Krigin, was a teacher.

After completing his secondary education and doing his military service, Anton entered the Faculty for the Restoration of Icons in The Kiev School of Fine Art. It was here that he familiarized himself with philosophy and religion.
In 1971, Solomukha was admitted to the studio workshop of the academician T. Yablonska and in 1973, he obtained a diploma as a ‘Monumentalist’ painter.

His vision of the world was influenced by artists such as stage designer Misha Frenkel, director Sergei Parajanov, writer Viktor Nekrasov, etc.

In 1971, his daughter Kristina Solomoukha was born.

Between 1975 and 1978, his dissident creative expression attracted the attention of political censors and he was summoned to appear before the KGB on several occasions.

In 1978, he finally succeeded in immigrating to France. He has lived and worked in Paris ever since.

Work

Painting

Between 1978 and 1980, Solomoukha began a period of experimentation with various techniques and types of aesthetic formulas.
A voyage to the United States in 1978–1980 proved to be a decisive moment in his artistic career.
In 1980, he exhibited in New York City, Boston, Cleveland, Washington, and Philadelphia.
In 1981, 1982, and 1983 he was invited by violinist Gidon Kremer to be the stage designer at the Lockenhaus Chamber Music Festival in Austria.
The influence of classical music, and his contact with renowned musicians left its mark in the work he did during this period.
In 1985, the project "the Great Myths" drew the attention of Cologne gallery owner Thomas Krings-Ernsta and Solomoukha exhibited there regularly until 1989.
In 1988, two paintings were acquired by Cologne's Ludwig Museum for its French Collection.

Until 2002, a series of Solomoukha's projects, such as "Boxers", "Mechanical Toys", "The Myths and the Limits", and "Jazz" were characterized by the formal search for ways of expression through opposition of different structures of thought, and by his obsession for paradox. His ideological, aesthetic, and ethical positions were formed under the influence of the French art critics Bernard Lamarche-Vadel and Michel Enrici.

The series of paintings titled "Allegory" (1979–2002) was much more figurative and picturesque. Citations of works of Baroque and a search for heroes and anti-heroes, based on major composite structures, were undergoing constant change, often under the influence of the photographic image.

Photography

In the search for new means of expression, a new visual language, Solomoukha became more and more attracted to photography.

In 1990, he was acquainted with Robert Doisneau and in 1995, he began working with Henri Cartier-Bresson. Both acquaintances strongly influenced his decision to devote himself to photography, which was his principal sphere of creativity since 2002.

His first photographic series consisted of "The girl with the cup-and-ball", "The Sex of Angels", "I Fuck Your TV", was characterized by the choice of a closed space and a dark background. He used mirrors as 'a complementary character' for the construction of a subject, ironic or poetic, inspired by historical myths and biblical subjects.
His obsession with these projects evolved into a rejection of temporal social topics. He created a series of photo compositions in the monumental style titled "Little Red Riding Hood visits the Louvre".
Although these large square panoramic compositions were technically photographs, they were projected and constructed as if they were painted pictures.
This style, called "photo-painting", played a role in the creation of a new contemporary art form.

The photographic paintings of this series were rather theatrical. The backgrounds were dark and the foregrounds filled with actors: characters from the streets of Paris interposed with naked models, animals and elements of still life. An infinite number of small objects were strewn on the ground and covered the walls.
The theatrical tableau style of this collection enabled the artist to break with the traditional photographic image and create a paradoxical metaphysical space. In them, each character, as in an opera, played a part while remaining an independent element.
In 2009, Solomoukha continued to refer to classical art in his project "Little Red Riding Hood visits Chernobyl".
His preference for "ironic allegory" allowed him to create works in a form reminiscent of paintings in the Louvre, depicting morbid scenes of the Chernobyl catastrophe.

See also
 Ukrainian Academy of Arts

References

External links
 Artmajeur
 Anton Solomoukha at Pascal Polar gallery, Brussels, Belgium
 Интернет Дневник Про Культуру
 Festival Européen de la Photo de Nu
 Photosapiens
 MonsieurPhoto
 Uno de los Nuestros

1945 births
2015 deaths
20th-century Ukrainian painters
20th-century Ukrainian male artists
21st-century Ukrainian painters
21st-century Ukrainian male artists
Ukrainian photographers
Ukrainian male painters